Carson Lambos (born January 14, 2003) is a Canadian junior ice hockey defenceman who plays for Winnipeg Ice of the Western Hockey League (WHL) as a prospect to the Minnesota Wild of the National Hockey League (NHL). Lambos was selected in the first round, 26th overall, by the Wild in the 2021 NHL Entry Draft.

Playing career
On August 25, 2021, Lambos signed a three year entry-level contract with the Minnesota Wild.

Career statistics

Regular season and playoffs

International

References

External links
 

2003 births
Living people
Canadian ice hockey defencemen
JYP Jyväskylä players
Kootenay Ice players
Minnesota Wild draft picks
National Hockey League first-round draft picks
Ice hockey people from Winnipeg
Winnipeg Ice players